Kim Jun-tae (born 31 May 1985) is a retired South Korean football player who played as a midfielder.

Club career 
He started his career at Korea National League side Changwon City FC. On 17 November 2009, Gangwon called him as extra order at 2010 K-League Draft. His first K-League match was against Seongnam Ilhwa Chunma in Seongnam, which Gangwon lost by 0–3 in an away game on 27 February 2010.

In July 2010, he moved back to his previous club, Changwon City FC.

Club career statistics 

Note: appearances and goals include championship playoffs.

References

External links
 
 

1985 births
Living people
Hannam University alumni
South Korean footballers
Association football midfielders
Changwon City FC players
Gangwon FC players
Goyang Zaicro FC players
Seoul E-Land FC players
Korea National League players
K3 League players
K League 1 players
K League 2 players